Gilles A. Perron (born December 10, 1940 in Évain, Quebec) is a Canadian politician.

Perron was a Bloc Québécois Member of the House of Commons of Canada first elected to the House in the Canadian federal election of 1997 from the riding of Saint-Eustache—Sainte-Thérèse. He was re-elected in the Canadian federal elections of 2000 and 2004 from the riding of Rivière-des-Mille-Îles.  Perron acted, at various times, as the Bloc's critic of Veterans Affairs, Public Service Renewal and National Revenue. He is a former political advisor and technician.

Notes

External links
 

1940 births
Bloc Québécois MPs
Living people
Members of the House of Commons of Canada from Quebec
People from Rouyn-Noranda
People from Saint-Eustache, Quebec
21st-century Canadian politicians